Paterno Legge is a South Sudanese politician. As of 2011, he is the Minister of Local Government of Central Equatoria.

References

21st-century South Sudanese politicians
Living people
Year of birth missing (living people)
People from Central Equatoria
Place of birth missing (living people)